Paul Migliazzo (born March 11, 1964) is a retired American football linebacker who played for the Chicago Bears in 1987.  He played college football at the University of Oklahoma and was a member of the school's 1985 national championship team.  Migliazzo was subsequently drafted by the Chicago Bears under coach Mike Ditka in 1987. He was waived in December of that year.

References

External links
Paul Migliazzo profile at NFL.com
Paul Magliazzo at Pro Football Reference

1964 births
American football linebackers
Chicago Bears players
Living people
Oklahoma Sooners football players
Players of American football from Kansas City, Missouri
National Football League replacement players